The 2013 Los Angeles Galaxy season was the club's eighteenth season of existence, and their eighteenth season in Major League Soccer, the top tier of the American and Canadian soccer pyramids.

The Galaxy entered the season as the two-time defending MLS Cup champions. They were eliminated by Real Salt Lake in the Conference Semifinals of the MLS Cup Playoffs. The team reached the semifinals of the 2012–13 CONCACAF Champions League, where they were knocked out by Monterrey. The Galaxy also qualified for the 2013–14 CONCACAF Champions League by virtue of winning the 2012 MLS Cup.

Background

Review

Club

Roster

Current roster

Team management

Competitions

Preseason

MLS

Standings 
Western Conference Table

Overall table

Results summary

Results by round

Match results

U.S. Open Cup

CONCACAF Champions League

2012–13 tournament

Quarterfinals

Semifinals

2013–14 tournament

Group stage

International Champions Cup

Statistics

Transfers

In

MLS Drafts

Out

Loan out

References 

LA Galaxy seasons
Los Angeles Galaxy
Los Angeles Galaxy
Los Angeles Galaxy